This article lists fellows of the Royal Society elected in 1957.

Fellows 

Saul Adler
Emmanuel Amoroso
Charlotte Auerbach
George Batchelor
William Ernest Burcham
Frederick Dainton, Baron Dainton
James Danielli
Sir Fred Hoyle
John Kenyon Netherton Jones
Henry Lipson
 Sir Leslie H. Martin
Sir John McMichael
Bruno Mendel
Cyril Leslie Oakley
Sir Harry Pitt
Francis Leslie Rose
Sir William Kershaw Slater
Sir Frank Ewart Smith
Ernest Lister Smith
Herbert Squire
Frederick Campion Steward
Walter Stanley Stiles
Reginald Sutcliffe
Darashaw Nosherwan Wadia
Alexander Watt
Walter Frederick Whittard

Foreign members 

Hans Bethe
Albert Frey-Wyssling
Otto Hahn
Arne Tiselius

Statute 12 fellow 
Robert Gascoyne-Cecil, 5th Marquess of Salisbury

References

1957
1957 in science
1957 in the United Kingdom